Riverside Township may refer to:

Illinois
 Riverside Township, Adams County, Illinois
 Riverside Township, Cook County, Illinois

Iowa
 Riverside Township, Fremont County, Iowa
 Riverside Township, Lyon County, Iowa

Kansas
 Riverside Township, Sedgwick County, Kansas
 Riverside Township, Trego County, Kansas, in Trego County, Kansas

Michigan
 Riverside Township, Missaukee County, Michigan

Minnesota
 Riverside Township, Lac qui Parle County, Minnesota

Nebraska
 Riverside Township, Burt County, Nebraska
 Riverside Township, Gage County, Nebraska

New Jersey
 Riverside Township, Burlington County, New Jersey

North Dakota
 Riverside Township, Steele County, North Dakota, in Steele County, North Dakota

South Dakota
 Riverside Township, Brown County, South Dakota, in Brown County, South Dakota
 Riverside Township, Clay County, South Dakota, in Clay County, South Dakota
 Riverside Township, Hand County, South Dakota, in Hand County, South Dakota
 Riverside Township, Mellette County, South Dakota, in Mellette County, South Dakota

Township name disambiguation pages